Maresme is a comarca (county) located along the Catalan Mediterranean coast in Spain, between the comarques of Barcelonès (at the Southwest) and Selva (at the Northeast), and also bordering with Vallès Oriental (at the west).

Its capital and largest city is Mataró (pop. 119,035 in 2007).

Geography
Maresme occupies a long and narrow area between the Mediterranean Sea and the hills of Serralada Litoral (Catalonia's coastal mountains), and specifically Montnegre's and 's hills in the northern half and Sant Mateu's hills in the southern half. This particular shape has conditioned both the geography and the history of this comarca. Probably the main distinct elements of its geography are the characteristic rieres (torrents). These short, intermittent streams, which cross the comarca transversally about every hundred meters, produce powerful and dangerous floods when it rains.

Maresme has been historically very well connected with the rest of the comarca as well as with Barcelona by the old Camí Ral (Royal Way) (current N-II main road) and railroad (The Barcelona–Mataró railroad route, finished in 1848, was the first ever in all the Iberian Peninsula). Communications were enhanced in recent years with the construction of the C-32's Barcelona–Mataró section (1969), which was the first autopista (highway) ever in Spain, and its subsequent enlargement, the Mataró-Palafolls's section (1995).

Municipalities

References

External links

Official comarcal web site
All the tourist information, shopping and services Maresme

 
Comarques of the Province of Barcelona